Harrie Walter Wade OBE (10 January 1905 – 18 November 1964) was an Australian politician. He was a member of the Country Party and served as a Senator for Victoria from 1956 until his death in 1964. He was the party's Senate leader and held ministerial office in the Menzies Government as Minister for Air (1960–1961) and Minister for Health (1961–1964).

Early life

Wade was born in Clear Lake, Victoria (about 40 km southwest of Horsham) and educated at Horsham State School and Horsham High School. He worked as a schoolteacher and clerk and then as an accountant at Goroke. In 1932, he married Olive May Newton and they took up farming near Natimuk. In 1954 he moved to a farm nearer Horsham.

Political career
Wade joined the United Country Party in 1934 and was elected to the Shire of Arapiles in 1941. At the 1949 election, he stood for the House of Representatives seat of Wimmera, but it was won by the Liberal candidate, William Lawrence.

At the 1955 election, Wade won a seat in the Senate from July 1956. He was appointed Minister for Air in December 1960 and Minister for Health in December 1961. He became Leader of the Country Party in the Senate in March 1961 and was promoted to Cabinet in December 1963. He was an unsuccessful candidate for the party's deputy leadership in 1963, losing to Charles Adermann after the retirement of Charles Davidson.

As health minister, he rejected advice to issue a public warning about thalidomide in December 1961.

Death

Wade had a heart attack on his farm in October 1964, and died of myocardial infarction that November, survived by his wife and son.

References

1905 births
1964 deaths
National Party of Australia members of the Parliament of Australia
Members of the Australian Senate for Victoria
Members of the Australian Senate
Members of the Cabinet of Australia
Australian Officers of the Order of the British Empire
20th-century Australian politicians
Australian Ministers for Health